Ashraf Jehangir Qazi (born 1942) is a Pakistani diplomat who has held several national and international appointments, including serving with the United Nations.

Early life and career
In 2004, UN Secretary-General Kofi Annan had named him as the head of the UN mission in Iraq where he helped co-ordinate humanitarian and reconstruction efforts. Before this appointment, he was serving as Pakistan's ambassador to the United States in Washington, D.C.

In 2007, Qazi was appointed as a special representative of UN Secretary-General Ban Ki-moon in Sudan. He completed his tenure in Sudan in 2010. Between 2004 and 2007, he was the Special Representative of the Secretary-General in charge of the United Nations Assistance Mission in Iraq.

Between 2002 and 2004, Qazi was Pakistan's ambassador to the United States. Before that, he was Pakistan's High Commissioner to India since 1997 and ambassador to Syria (1986–88), East Germany (1990–91), Russia (1991–94), and later to China (1994–97). While at the Ministry of Foreign Affairs in Islamabad, he served as director of East Asia (1975–1978), director-general for Policy Planning, Afghanistan (1982–1986) and Additional Foreign Secretary for Policy Planning, Afghanistan, Soviet Union and Eastern Europe (1988–1990). He also has had diplomatic assignments in Copenhagen, Tokyo, Cairo, Tripoli and London.

Personal life
Ashraf Qazi was the only son of an ethnic Hazara father, Qazi Mohammad Musa, and an Irish mother, Jennifer Musa. His father belonged to the prominent Qazi family of Balochistan, whose notable members included Ashraf's paternal uncle, Qazi Muhammad Essa, a leading figure of the Pakistan Movement; and Essa's son Qazi Faez Isa, a Supreme Court justice who formerly served as the Chief Justice of Balochistan High Court. Ashraf's paternal grandfather served as the prime minister of the princely Kalat State.

His mother was Catholic and a native of County Kerry, Ireland. Ashraf's parents met in England in 1939 while his father was studying philosophy at Oxford; they married in 1940, and settled in his paternal family's hometown of Pishin in Balochistan in 1947, from where his mother eventually came into Pakistani politics. In 1956, when Ashraf was aged 14, his father died in a road accident. He was thus raised by his mother. Ashraf has five half-siblings from his father's first marriage.

Further reading

References

External links
H.E. Ashraf Qazi Speaks at the U.S. Institute of Peace Archived from the original on 4 February 2012
IRAQ: Interview with the UN Special Representative for Iraq, Ashraf Qazi, IRIN, 24 March 2005
Qazi interview with CNN's Wolf Blitzer on the situation in Afghanistan, aired 21 March 2004

1942 births
Living people
Abbottabad Commission
Ambassadors of Pakistan to China
Ambassadors of Pakistan to East Germany
Ambassadors of Pakistan to Russia
Ambassadors of Pakistan to Syria
Ambassadors of Pakistan to the United States
High Commissioners of Pakistan to India
Pakistan Tehreek-e-Insaf politicians
Pakistani expatriates in Iraq
Pakistani officials of the United Nations
Pakistani people of Hazara descent
Pakistani people of Irish descent
People from Pishin District
Special Representatives of the Secretary-General of the United Nations
Hazara people
Qazi family
St Francis Grammar School alumni
United Nations operations in Iraq